Llawi Imaña (Aymara llawi padlock, imaña to guard, to hide, to bury, also spelled Llavi Imana) is a  mountain in the Andes of Bolivia. It is situated in the La Paz Department, Larecaja Province, Sorata Municipality, north of the Cordillera Real.

See also 
 Wila Wilani

References 

Mountains of La Paz Department (Bolivia)